Baselios Marthoma Mathews III (born 12 February 1949) is the present Catholicos of the East and Malankara Metropolitan of the Malankara Orthodox Syrian Church, serving as its primate. He was enthroned as the 22nd Malankara Metropolitan on 14 October 2021 and as the 9th Catholicos on 15 October 2021 at St. Peter and St. Paul's Church, Parumala, succeeding Baselios Marthoma Paulose II. He is the reckoned as the 92nd Primate on the Apostolic Throne of St. Thomas by the MOSC.

Early life and education
Mathews was born on 12 February 1949 to Cherian Anthrayos of Mattathil family in Vazhoor. He studied chemistry at Kerala University and Theology at Orthodox Theological Seminary, Kottayam and Serampore College. He procured his Master's degree from Leningrad Theological Seminary and Doctorate in Oriental theology from Pontifical Oriental Institute at Rome. where he specialized in the Christology of Philoxenos of Mabbug of the West Syriac tradition. In 2022, he was given an honorary degree from Saint Vladimir's Orthodox Theological Seminary in Yonkers, New York.

Ministry

Priesthood
He was ordained as a deacon in 1976 and then as a priest in 1978 by Baselios Mathews I.  On 30 April 1991 he was consecrated to the order of Episcopos. In 1994, he was consecrated as a metropolitan of the Diocese of Kandanad West. He has also served as the assistant metropolitan of the Diocese of Idukki and is currently serving as the Metropolitan of Idukki since 2019.

He has been a teacher at Orthodox Theological Seminary, Kottayam, since 1984. He has taught Christology in the graduate and post-graduate levels while guiding a number of doctoral theses. He has authored several scholarly books and articles in the field of Theology. He has also served as the Executive Secretary to the Holy Episcopal Synod. The Holy Episcopal synod held at Devalokam Aramana nominated him as the successor to the Catholicos of the East & Malankara Metropolitan on 16 September 2021.

He has organized several charitable projects at the diocesan level. Mar Pachomios Charitable Society, formed in the memory of his predecessor Joseph Mar Pachomios, Metropolitan of Kandanad, runs over a dozen charitable projects including; Pratheeksha Bhavan, Prasanthi Bhavan, Prathyasa Bhavan, Pradanam Centre, Pramodam Project, Prasannam Bhavan, Prakasam Institute of Special Education and Prathibha Products.

Catholicos of the East and Malankara Metropolitan
In October 2021, the Holy Synod and Managing committee designated him as the new Malankara Metropolitan and Catholicos of Malankara Church, succeeding Baselios Marthoma Paulose II, who died in July 2021. He was enthroned as the 22nd Malankara Metropolitan during the Malankara Association that took place on 14 October 2021 at St. Peter and St. Paul's Church, Parumala. He was enthroned as Catholicos of the Apostolic Throne of Saint Thomas on 15 October 2021 by the Holy Synod of Malankara Church. The chief celebrant of the enthronement service and Holy Eucharist was Kuriakose Mar Clemis who is the senior metropolitan of Malankara Orthodox Syrian Church.

Cardinal Mar George Alenchery inaugurated a meeting held to congratulate the new head of the church. Panakkad Syed Sadiq Ali Shihab Thangal, Cardinal Mar Cleemis, Suffragan Metropolitan Euyakim Mar Coorilos, Bishop Selvister Ponnumuthan, Bishop Awgin Kuriakose, Yuhanon Mar Diascoros Metropolitan, minister V N Vasavan, among others spoke during the meeting. Felicitation letters from Patriarch Kirill, the supreme head of Russian Orthodox Church, and other International Ecumenical heads was also read on the occasion. Fr Alexander Kurien also conveyed wishes from the US President Joe Biden and presented a memento from the White House.

Episcopal Consecrations
Mathews III consecrated seven metropolitan bishops at St. Mary’s Orthodox Cathedral, Pazhanji on 28 July, 2022. The metropolitans are Abraham Stephanos, Thomas Ivanios, Geevarghese Theophilos, Geevarghese Philoxenos, Geevarghese Pachomios, Geevarghese Barnabas and Zacharias Severios.

Titles
Malankara Metropolitan
Catholicos of the Apostolic See of Saint Thomas in Malankara and East

Works 
Word Became Flesh: The Christology of Philoxenos of Mabbug

Festschrifts
Begotten, Not Made 
This collection of essays on Christology was published in 2017 by the colleagues and students of Mar Severios at the Seminary to mark the 25th year of his Episcopal consecration.

Notes

External links
 Website of the Malankara Orthodox Syrian Church
 Website of Mar Pachomios Charitable Society

1949 births
Malankara Orthodox Syrian Church bishops
Living people
20th-century Oriental Orthodox bishops
21st-century Oriental Orthodox bishops